Boldenone (developmental code name RU-18761), is a naturally occurring anabolic–androgenic steroid (AAS) and the 1(2)-dehydrogenated analogue of testosterone. Boldenone itself has never been marketed; as a pharmaceutical drug, it is used as boldenone undecylenate, the undecylenate ester.

Side effects

Pharmacology

Pharmacodynamics
Like other AAS, boldenone is an agonist of the androgen receptor (AR). The activity of boldenone is mainly anabolic, with a low androgenic potency. Boldenone will increase nitrogen retention, protein synthesis, increases appetite and stimulates the release of erythropoietin in the kidneys. Boldenone was synthesized in an attempt to create a long-acting injectable metandienone, for androgen deficiency disorders. Boldenone acts similar to metandienone with fewer adverse androgenic effects. Although commonly compared to nandrolone, boldenone lacks progesterone receptor interaction and associated progestogenic side effects.

Chemistry

Boldenone, also known as Δ1-testosterone, 1-dehydrotestosterone, or androsta-1,4-dien-17β-ol-3-one, is a naturally occurring androstane steroid and a derivative of testosterone. It is specifically testosterone with a double bond between the C1 and C2 positions. A related compound is quinbolone, the 17-cyclopentenyl enol ether of boldenone.

Sources
Boldenone occurs naturally in the scent gland of Ilybius fenestratus, a species of aquatic beetle.

History
Ciba reportedly patented boldenone in 1949. It subsequently developed several experimental esters of the drug in the 1950s and 1960s. One of these was boldenone undecylenate, which was introduced for clinical use under the brand name Parenabol and saw some use in the late 1960s and early 1970s. However, it was discontinued before the end of the 1970s. Subsequently, boldenone undecylenate was introduced by Squibb under the brand name Equipose for veterinary use, most commonly in horses.

Society and culture

Generic names

Brand names
Boldenone is marketed as veterinary drug as boldenone undecylenate (a derivative of boldenone) under the following brand names: Boldebal H, Equipoise, and Sybolin. It is marketed as a veterinary combination drug with methandriol under the brand name Drive.

In Ukraine, it is marketed for human consumption as the injectable steroid Boldenol.

Doping in sports

There are many known cases of doping in sports with boldenone undecylenate by professional athletes.

References

External links
 Equipoise (boldenone undecylenate) - William Llewellyn's Anabolic.org

Secondary alcohols
Androgens and anabolic steroids
Androstanes
Conjugated dienes
Drugs in sport
Equine medications
Enones
World Anti-Doping Agency prohibited substances